Gyrinus ventralis is a species of beetles from the Gyrinidae family. The scientific name of this species was first published in Kirby.

References

Gyrinidae
Beetles described in 1837
Taxa named by William Kirby (entomologist)